The Mandolin Concerto in C major, RV 425, was written by the Italian composer Antonio Vivaldi in 1725 

Music from the first movement of the concerto was featured in the 1979 movie Kramer vs. Kramer.

Movements
There are three movements:
Allegro
Largo (A minor)
Allegro

The first movement is a rapid, cheerful tune lasting slightly more than three minutes. Throughout the piece, Vivaldi creates sharp and low contrasts between the mandolin and the rest of the orchestra, attracting much attention to several crescendos within the music.

The second movement, is slightly less than three minutes long, and in contrast to the rapid and enthusiastic tune of the first movement, is slower and thoughtful in its composition.

The third movement makes more use of the string orchestra, where the mandolin is not heard at the beginning or the ending of the movement. The string section repeats the beginning portion as the ending of this movement.

See also
List of compositions by Antonio Vivaldi

References

External links

, played by Avi Avital in 2012

Concertos by Antonio Vivaldi
1725 compositions
Compositions in C major